Želenice is a municipality and village in Most District in the Ústí nad Labem Region of the Czech Republic. It has about 500 inhabitants.

Administrative parts
The village of Liběšice is an administrative part of Želenice.

References

Villages in Most District